Thomas Daniel Calnan (16 December 1915 – 13 September 1981) was an English pilot and prisoner-of-war of World War II, who wrote a memoir of his time in German captivity entitled Free As A Running Fox.

Calnan was commissioned in the RAF on 19 December 1936.

Calnan was shot down while flying a Spitfire on a photo-reconnaissance mission over France in December 1941. He gives some brief background about himself and his flying career with the RAF's No. 1 Photographic Reconnaissance Unit, but devotes most of the book to his escape attempts while a prisoner of the Germans.  He was incarcerated at Stalag Luft III during the period of the "Great Escape."

He was promoted to the rank of Wing Commander on 1 January 1949, and retired on 14 February 1959. Calnan latterly lived in Zinal, Switzerland, where he died in September 1981 at the age of 65.

References

1915 births
1981 deaths
Royal Air Force wing commanders
Shot-down aviators
British World War II prisoners of war